Eliot Wolf (born March 21, 1982) is an American football executive and scout who is currently the director of scouting for the New England Patriots of the National Football League (NFL). He was previously the assistant general manager of the Cleveland Browns, and before that, he served in the Green Bay Packers' scouting department for 14 seasons.

Early life
Wolf was born on March 21, 1982 in Oakland, California. He graduated from Notre Dame Academy in Green Bay, Wisconsin in 2000 and from the University of Miami in 2003. Wolf's father, Ron Wolf, was general manager of the Packers.

Executive career
Wolf joined the Packers as a pro personnel assistant in 2004. He became assistant director of pro personnel in 2008 and assistant director of player personnel in 2011 before assuming his current position in 2012. On January 2, 2015, Wolf was promoted to director of player personnel. On March 21, 2016, Wolf was promoted to director-football operations. In April 2016, Bob McGinn of the Milwaukee Journal Sentinel and Brian Manzullo of the Detroit Free Press reported that Wolf  was a candidate for the vacant Detroit Lions general manager position, but the Packers denied the Lions' request to interview him.

Following the final regular season game of the 2016 season the San Francisco 49ers fired general manager Trent Baalke, prompting sportswriter Ian Rapoport to highlight Wolf as a potential new general manager of the team. On January 3, 2017 Tom Pelissero of USA Today reported that the 49ers would interview Wolf for the general manager position.

Wolf has been described as on the "short list" of candidates for general manager positions around the NFL, including being in consideration for the position in Green Bay as the successor to Ted Thompson.  That position was given to Brian Gutekunst on January 7, 2018.

References

1982 births
Living people
Businesspeople from Oakland, California
Cleveland Browns executives
Green Bay Packers executives
New England Patriots executives
Notre Dame Academy (Green Bay, Wisconsin) alumni
Sportspeople from Green Bay, Wisconsin
University of Miami alumni